Elvis is a Swedish comic strip created in 2000 by Tony Cronstam for the free daily newspaper Metro, as well as other more local newspapers.

Elvis Tonysson, the main character of the comic, is a middle-aged man portrayed as a tortoise, according to Cronstam loosely based on himself, and like most of the recurring characters based on friends and family.

The main plot of the strip is according to Cronstam based on day-to-day annoyances encountered in real life. The plot of the strips published in the daily newspaper usually don't stretch over multiple strips, making the strip easy to understand even for non-daily readers, which is the case with most daily newspaper strips. There are also several comic books released, some of which feature a main plot.

Tony's wife Maria Cronstam became a main part in the development of the comic, as the strip more and more got based on their life together with their daughter. After the relationship broke up, the strip itself was cancelled.

See also 

 Rocky, comic strip

External links 

Elvis the comic
Metro - comic strips

Swedish comic strips
2000 comics debuts
Gag-a-day comics
Fictional psychologists
Fictional turtles
Fictional Swedish people